Carl Healey (born 29 March 1987) is an Australian international lawn bowler. He has represented Australia at the Commonwealth Games and won a silver medal.

Bowls career
He started bowling in 2000 and won the Australian Open fours in 2008 and pairs in 2018.

In 2022, he competed in the men's triples and the men's fours at the 2022 Commonwealth Games. Healey, along with Ben Twist and Barrie Lester won the silver medal in the triples.

References

Australian male bowls players
1987 births
Living people
Bowls players at the 2022 Commonwealth Games
Commonwealth Games medallists in lawn bowls
Commonwealth Games silver medallists for Australia
Medallists at the 2022 Commonwealth Games